Hemerocallis hakuunensis, known as Baekunsan daylily, is a species in the family Asphodelaceae, native to Korea.

Its Korean name is Baegunsan wonchuri. Baegunsan is the name of several mountains. The word wonchuri refers to a variety of daylily species in Korean, and H. hakuunensis is the most commonly encountered and gastronomically consumed daylily species in Korea.

References

hakuunensis
Plants described in 1943